Struhařov is a municipality and village in Benešov District in the Central Bohemian Region of the Czech Republic. It has about 1,000 inhabitants.

Administrative parts
Villages and hamlets of Babčice, Bořeňovice, Budkov, Býkovice, Dolní Podhájí, Hliňánky, Horní Podhájí, Jezero, Myslíč, Pecínov, Skalice, Střížkov, Svatý Jan and Věřice are administrative parts of Struhařov.

Gallery

References

Villages in Benešov District